José Cantón Landazuri (23 March 1937 – 13 November 2013) was a Spanish professional footballer who played as a forward.

Club career
Born in Basauri, Biscay, Cantón played for CD Basconia, Racing de Santander, CD San Fernando (two spells), CF Reus Deportiu, Gimnàstic de Tarragona and Cádiz CF during an 18-year senior career. He played in Segunda División with the second, third and last clubs, competing with the remaining in the lower leagues.

Later life and death
Cantón worked as a manager after retiring, exclusively at amateur level, He died on 13 November 2013 in San Fernando, Cádiz, at the age of 76.

References

External links

1937 births
2013 deaths
People from Basauri
Sportspeople from Biscay
Spanish footballers
Footballers from the Basque Country (autonomous community)
Association football forwards
Segunda División players
Tercera División players
CD Basconia footballers
Racing de Santander players
CD San Fernando players
CF Reus Deportiu players
Gimnàstic de Tarragona footballers
Cádiz CF players
Spanish football managers